Pompey Center is a hamlet in the town of Pompey in Onondaga County, New York, United States.  It is the location of Pompey Centre District No. 10 Schoolhouse, a historic one-room schoolhouse listed on the U.S. National Register of Historic Places.

Hamlets in Onondaga County, New York
Hamlets in New York (state)